Evelyn Lucy Colyer (later Munro, 16 August 1902 – 4 November 1930) was a female tennis player from Great Britain. With Joan Austin, sister of Bunny Austin, Colyer played doubles in the 1923 Wimbledon final against Suzanne Lenglen and Elizabeth Ryan. Colyer and Austin were known in the British press as "The Babes." At the 1924 Paris Olympics, she teamed with Dorothy Shepherd-Barron to win a bronze medal in the women's doubles event.

From 1920 until 1929, she competed in all editions of the Wimbledon Championships. Her best singles result was reaching the fourth round in 1927 in which she was defeated by Kitty Godfree.

In 1925, she teamed with P.B.D Spence and won the mixed doubles title at the Queen's Club Covered Courts Championships.

She was part of the winning British Wightman Cup team in 1924 and 1925 as well as the team that lost in 1926.

On 13 February 1930 she married Hamish Munro, a tea planter from Assam, British India and soon afterward, the couple migrated to Assam. She died on 6 November 1930 of complications after giving birth to twins on 20 October.

Grand Slam finals

Doubles (4 runners-up)

References

External links
 
 
 Olympics profile
 Olympic tennis guide

1902 births
1930 deaths
British female tennis players
Olympic tennis players of Great Britain
Olympic bronze medallists for Great Britain
Tennis players at the 1924 Summer Olympics
Olympic medalists in tennis
Medalists at the 1924 Summer Olympics
English female tennis players
Tennis people from Greater London